The Premio Mylius was an Italian prize for painting. It was established by the Austrian industrialist  in 1841 and awarded by the Accademia di Brera in Milan, which at that time was under Habsburg rule. In 1856 there were two types of award, an annual prize of 700 Austrian lire for a painting in oils, and a biennial award of 1000 lire for fresco work. It was awarded until the outbreak of the Second World War.

Among the recipients of the award were Salvatore Mazza (1856), Pietro Michis (1868), Vespasiano Bignami (1869), Giovanni Battista Ferrari (1870), Filippo Carcano (1878), (1884) Amerino Cagnoni (1886), Francesco Filippini (1890), Egidio Riva (1902), Donato Frisia (1920) and Trento Longaretti (1939).

References

Brera Academy
Awards established in 1841
1841 establishments in Italy
Awards disestablished in 1939
1939 disestablishments in Italy